Joseph Paul Gelhardt (born 4 May 2002) is an English professional footballer who plays as a forward for Championship club Sunderland, on loan from Leeds United.

Club career

Wigan Athletic
Born in Liverpool, Gelhardt grew up in Netherton, Merseyside, where he attended Chesterfield High School. He joined Wigan Athletic at the age of ten in 2013, progressing through the youth teams before being offered a scholarship deal in 2017. He made his professional debut for Wigan Athletic on 14 August 2018, appearing as a substitute against Rotherham United in the first round of the EFL Cup.

On 24 August 2018, he signed his first professional contract with the club. He made his League debut on 27 April 2019, appearing as a half-time substitute against Birmingham City. On 14 September 2019, he scored his first senior goal for the club in a 2–2 draw against Hull City.

Gelhardt made 19 appearances in all competitions with 18 coming in the EFL Championship during the 2019–20 season, as Wigan were relegated from the Championship after a 12-point penalty saw them drop into the relegation places.

Leeds United
On 10 August 2020, Gelhardt signed a four-year contract with Premier League club Leeds United. He made his senior debut for Leeds United on 21 September 2021 as a second-half substitute for Mateusz Klich in the EFL Cup third round match against EFL Championship side Fulham. The match ended 0–0 with Leeds winning 6–5 on penalties, Gelhardt scoring the seventh of Leeds' eight penalties. Gelhardt made his Premier League debut for Leeds on 16 October as a second-half substitute in the 1–0 defeat to Southampton. On 11 December 2021, Gelhardt scored his first goal for Leeds in a 2–3 away league defeat to rivals Chelsea. and he netted his second on 13 March 2022: a dramatic added-time 2-1 winner at Elland Road against Norwich City.

In the 2022–23 season, Gelhardt's 10 appearances through the end of October were mostly limited to late substitutions, mostly for Sinisterra and Rodrigo, allowing little time for him to impress himself on the direction of the game. On 27 January 2023, Gelhardt joined Championship play-off pushing side Sunderland on loan until the end of the 2022–23 season. He scored his first goal for Sunderland on 21 February 2023 in a 2-1 defeat to Rotherham United.

International career
Gelhardt scored for the England under-16 team in a 3–3 draw against Brazil at the 2018 Montaigu Tournament.

In September 2018, Gelhardt scored twice for the England under-17 team against Norway and also came off the bench to score against Belgium. The following month saw him score against the United States and twice in a game against Russia. In March 2019, Gelhardt scored in a 3–2 win against Denmark that confirmed qualification for the 2019 UEFA European Under-17 Championship. In April 2019, Gelhardt was included in the England U17 squad for the 2019 UEFA European Under-17 Championships and scored in a 3–1 victory over Sweden under-17s as the Young Lions bowed out of the competition at the group stage.

Gelhardt made his U18 debut as a 79th-minute substitute during the 3–2 win over Australia at Hinckley Leicester Road on 6 September 2019. On 2 October 2020, Gelhardt was named in the England U19 squad.

On 6 September 2021, Gelhardt made his debut for the England U20s scoring a brace during a 6–1 victory over Romania U20s at St. George's Park.

Gelhardt received his first call up to the England U21s on 4 October 2021, as an injury replacement for Noni Madueke.

Style of play
Gelhardt is left footed and plays mainly as a striker; he can also play as a second striker, wide forward or as an attacking midfielder. He is known for his dribbling, power and build-up play; his style has been compared to that of Wayne Rooney.

Personal life
Gelhardt supported Liverpool growing up.

Career statistics

References

2002 births
Living people
Footballers from Liverpool
English footballers
Association football forwards
Wigan Athletic F.C. players
Leeds United F.C. players
Sunderland A.F.C. players
English Football League players
Premier League players
England youth international footballers
English people of German descent